The Ministry of Industry, Trade and Tourism (MINCOTUR) is the department of the Government of Spain responsible for the proposal and execution of the government policy on industry, trade and tourism, including among its competences the industrial development and of the SMEs, the promotion and defense of the industrial property, the commercial policy of internationalization and of investments and external transactions, as well as the politics of tourism and the rest of competences and attributions that the legal system attributes to it. Likewise, in coordination with the Foreign Ministry is responsible for the international cooperation on this matters.

The Industry Ministry, along with the Defence Ministry, has an important presence in the military industry. The MINCOTUR supervises the imports and exports of military materials through the Interministerial Regulatory Board on Foreign Trade of Defense Material and Dual Purpose (JIMDDU) of the Secretariat of State for Trade. Likewise, the Ministry of Industry regularly grants loans to state-owned enterprises for the promotion of this industry and the realization of military projects.

The MINCOTUR is headed by the Minister of Industry, Trade and Tourism, who is appointed by the Monarch at request of the Prime Minister, after hearing the Council of Ministers. The Minister, currently the economist Reyes Maroto, is assisted by four main officials, the Secretary of State for Tourism, the Secretary of State for Trade, the Secretary General for Industry and Small and Medium Enterprises and the Under Secretary of Industry, Trade and Tourism.

History

Early period 
Government action in the field of Industry within the historical limits of Spanish constitutionalism, can be traced to the early 19th century. In 9 November 1832 the Ministry of Development was created and among other responsibilities, it had the domestic and foreign trade; industry, arts, crafts and manufactures.

The linkage of the industry to the Development Ministry was maintained until 1922. Even during the period 1900–1905, the Department was named Agriculture, Industry, Trade and Public Works. On the other hand, in 1910 the Directorate-General for Trade, Industry and Labour was created. Between 1922 and 1928 the newly created the Ministry of Labour assumed the powers over Industry and Commerce.

Late period 

The end of the Military Directorate in 1925, the restoration of the ministerial regime and the economic circumstances led to the creation of the Ministry of National Economy by Royal Decree-Law of 3 November 1928, in response to public opinion that this affairs required to be placed under one direction only, both in terms of production, trade and consumption; and that to date they were dispersed among the rest of the government departments. The National Economy Council depended on the new Economy Ministry, although slightly modified, continuing with its work of collecting and contrasting the realities of the country around each and every one of the sectors of his economic life.

The Ministry was also integrated by the following organisms:

 The Ministry of Development transferred to it the Directorate-General for Agriculture, with the agricultural chambers, agronomic council and association of Cattle Ranchers and the services of Hygiene and Animal Health.
 The Office of the Prime Minister transferred to it the National Economy Council and Directorate-General for Tariffs and Valuations, whose holder was the vice president of the council.
 From the Ministries of Labor and Interior, it were transferred respectively the responsibilities on Commerce and Supply, which met in the same Directorate-General for Trade and Supply.
 The Ministry of Labour also transferred to it the Directorate-General for Industry, with the School of Industrial Engineers, as well as provincial inspectorates.

During this period, its headquarters were in the same building as the Ministry of Development, with the exception of the National Economy Council, which was located on Magdalena Street, 12 in Madrid.

By Decree of 16 December 1931, the department was renamed as Ministry of Agriculture, Industry and Trade. The National Economy Council was transformed into the National Economy Planning Council.

In 1933, during the premiership of Manuel Azaña, the Ministry of Agriculture, Industry and Trade split in two and while the responsibilities on industry and commerce stayed in this department, agriculture affairs were transferred to the new Ministry of Agriculture. This ministry was structured through three departments: the Directorate-General for Industry, the Directorate-General for Trade and the Directorate-General for Mines and Fuel.

This structure was maintained until 1951 when because of the growth of the commercial activity, in which —according to the dictator— made inexcusable a greater attention of the States, especially in its two most important aspects, of supplies and foreign currency, reached such extension that completely absorbed the activity of one Ministry, given the dimensions and complexity of the problems in which the Administration was obliged to intervene; and the industrial development of Spain and the forced promotion of mining and production of energy and basic materials, contained in itself more than enough field to absorb all the activities of a single ministerial department, forced the government to split the Ministry of Industry and Trade in two.

Since the approval of the Constitution in 1978, the Industry Ministry was renamed Ministry of Industry and Energy with responsibilities on the industrial and energy policies and, since 1988, for the first time, it assumed competences over technological development and innovation because of «the accession of Spain to the Treaty of Rome and the measures of application of the Single European Act » which required «an effort to increase the competitiveness of Spanish industry». Also, the Government considered necessary for "emphasize those elements that will determine the competitive position of industrial companies in the immediate future: the development and application of new technologies in the industry, and care for design and product quality industrial".In 2000 the Ministry was suppressed and its components were divided between the Ministry of Economy (mining and energy) and the Ministry of Science and Technology (industry and technology). This last Ministry, considered the direct successor, in words of its minister Anna Birulés in her speech before Congress in 21 June 2000 «the Department is responsible for the challenge but also the opportunity to make the decisive process of promoting the culture of innovation in our country a reality in the time horizon of this legislature». This was reverted in 2004 when the new government recovered the Ministry but not only with the industrial responsibilities but with its historical trade responsibilities and tourism and telecoms ones.

In 2012, the ministry lost again its trade responsibilities that were assumed by the Ministry of Economy and Competitiveness. Again in 2016, the ministry lost its autonomy after being merged in the Economy Ministry and the responsibilities on energy, telecoms and tourism got their own ministry.

The new Prime Minister Pedro Sánchez recovered the Ministry in 2018 with competencies on industrial affairs, trade and tourism sector. However, the telecoms powers remained in the Ministry of Economy and, for the first time, the recovered Ministry of Environment (renamed for the Ecological Transition) assumed the powers on energy.

Organization chart 
The current structure of the Ministry is the following:

 The Secretariat of State for Trade
 The Directorate-General for International Trade and Investments
 The Directorate-General for Commercial Policy
The Deputy Directorate-General for Internationalization Strategy
The Deputy Directorate-General for Studies and Evaluation of Commercial Policy Instruments
 The Secretariat of State for Tourism
The Deputy Directorate-General for Tourism Cooperation and Competitiveness
The Deputy Directorate-General for Tourism Development and Sustainability
The Division for Information Analysis and Evaluation of Tourism Policies.
The General Secretariat for Industry and Small and Medium Enterprises
 The Directorate-General for Industry and Small and Medium Enterprises
The Undersecretariat of Industry, Trade and Tourism
 The Technical General Secretariat
The Deputy Directorate-General for the Administrative Office and Financial Administration
The Deputy Directorate-General for Information and Communication Technologies
The Budget Office.
The Deputy Directorate-General for the General Inspectorate of Services and Relationship with Citizens
The Deputy Directorate-General for Planning

List of Industry Ministers

Dictatorship of Miguel Primo de Rivera (1928–1931)
 (November 1928 – January 1930) Francisco Moreno Zuleta (13).
 (January 1930 – January 1930) Sebastián Castedo Palero (13).
 (February 1930 – August 1930) Julio Wais San Martín (13).
 (August 1930 – February 1931) Luis Rodríguez de Viguri (13).
 (February 1931 – April 1931) Gabino Bugallal (13).

Second Republic (1931–1939)
 (December 1931 – June 1933) Marcelino Domingo Sanjuán (12).
 (June 1933 – September 1933) José Roca Franchy and (9).
 (September 1933 – 10 1933) Laureano Gómez Paratcha (9).
 (October 1933 – December 1933) Felix Gordon de Ordaz (9).
 (December 1933 – April 1934) Ricardo Samper Ibáñez (9).
 (April 1934 – October 1934) Vicente Iranzo Enguita (9).
 (October 1934 – April 1935) Andres Orozco Batista (9).
 (April 1935 – May 1935) Manuel Marraco Ramon (9).
 (May 1935 – September 1935) Rafael Aizpún Santafé (9).
 (September 1935 – October 1935) José Martínez de Velasco (11).
 (October 1935 – December 1935) John Usabiaga Lasquivar (11).
 (December 1935 – December 1935) Joaquín de Pablo-Blanco Torres (11).
 (December 1935 – February 1936) José María Álvarez Mendizábal (November).
 (February 1935 – September 1936) Plácido Alvarez-Buylla and Lozana (9).
 (September 1936 – November 1936) Anastasio de Gracia Villarrubia (9).
 (November 1936 – May 1937) Joan Peiro Belis (7).
 (November 1936 – May 1937) Juan López Sánchez (8).

Franco (1936–1975)
 (October 1936 – January 1938) Joaquín Bau (9).
 (January 1938 – August 1939) Juan Antonio Suances (9).
 (August 1939 – October 1940): Luis Alarcón de la Lastra (9).
 (October 1940 – July 1945) Demetrio Carceller Segura (9).
 (July 1945 – July 1951) Juan Antonio Suances (9).
 (July 1951 – July 1962) Joaquín Planell (7).
 (July 1951 – February 1957) Manuel Arburúa of Miyar (8).
 (February 1957 – July 1965) Alberto Ullastres (8).
 (July 1962 – 10 1969) Gregorio López-Bravo (7).
 (July 1965 – 10 1969) Faustino Garcia-Moncada Fernández (8).
 (October 1969 – January 1974) José María López de Letona (7).
 (October 1969 – June 1973) Enrique Fontana (8).
 (June 1973 – January 1974) Augustine Cotorruelo (8).
 (January 1974 – March 1975) Alfredo Santos Blanco (7).
 (January 1974 – March 1975) Nemesio Fernández-Cuesta (8).
 (March 1975 – December 1975) Alfonso Álvarez Miranda (7).
 (March 1975 – December 1975) José Luis Ceron Ayuso (8).
 (March 1975 – December 1975) León Herrera Esteban (September).

Reign of Juan Carlos I
Preconstitutional Period
 (December 1975 – July 1977) Carlos Pérez de Bricio (7).
 (December 1975 – July 1976) Leopoldo Calvo-Sotelo (8).
 (July 1976 – July 1977) José Lladó Fernández-Urrutia (8).
Constituent Assembly (1977–1979)
 (August 1977 – February 1978) Alberto Oliart Saussol, UCD (7)
 (August 1977 – April 1979) Juan Antonio García Díez, UCD (8)
 (February 1978 – April 1979) Agustín Rodríguez Sahagún, UCD (3)
I Legislature (1979–1982)
 (April 1979 – May 1980) Juan Antonio García Díez, UCD (8)
 (April 1979 – May 1980) Carlos Bustelo García del Real UCD (7)
 (May 1980 – December 1982) Ignacio Bayón Mariné UCD (3)
 (December 1981 – December 1982): Luis Gámir, UCD (6).
II Legislature (1982–1986)
 (December 1982 – July 1985) Carlos Solchaga Catalan, PSOE (3)
 (July 1985 – July 1986) Joan Majó, PSOE (3)
III Legislature (1986–1989)
 (July 1986 – July 1988): Luis Carlos Croissier Batista, PSOE (3)
 (July 1988 – 1989) Claudio Aranzadi, PSOE (3).
IV Legislature (1989–1993)
 (1989 – July 1993) Claudio Aranzadi, PSOE (3), (5)
V Legislature (1993–1996)
 (July 1993 – May 1996) Juan Manuel Eguiagaray, PSOE (3)
 (July 1993 – May 1996) Javier Gómez-Navarro, PSOE (4)
VI Legislature (1996–2000)
 (May 1996 – April 2000) Josep Piqué, PP (3)
Seventh Legislature (2000–2004)
 (April 2000 – July 2002 Ana Birulés, PP (2)
 (July 2002 – September 2003 Josep Piqué, PP (2)
 (September 2003 – April 2004 Juan Costa Climent, PP (2)
VIII Legislature (2004–2008)
 (April 2004 – September 2006)  José Montilla Aguilera, PSOE (1)
 (September 2006 – April 2008)  Joan Clos i Matheu, PSOE (1)
IX Legislature (2008–2011)
 (April 2008 – December 2011):  Miguel Sebastián Gascón, PSOE (1)
X Legislature (2011–2015)
 (December 2011–15 April 2016):  José Manuel Soria López, PP (14)
XI Legislature (2015–2016)
 (15 April 2016 – 4 November 2016): Luis de Guindos, Independent (PP) (14) (Acting minister)
XII Legislature (2016–present)
 (4 November 2016 – 7 March 2018): Luis de Guindos, Independent (PP) (15)
 (7 March 2018 – 7 June 2018): Román Escolano, Independent (PP) (15)
 (7 June 2018 – present): Reyes Maroto, PSOE (16)

Name
 (1) Industry, Tourism and Trade.
 (2) Science and Technology.
 (3) Industry and Energy.
 (4) Trade and Tourism.
 (5) Industry, Trade and Tourism.
 (6) Trade and Tourism.
 (7) Industry.
 (8) Trade.
 (9) Industry and Trade.
 (10) Industry, Commerce and Supplies.
 (11) Industry, Commerce and Agriculture.
 (12) Agriculture, Trade and Industry.
 (13) National Economy
 (14) Industry, Energy and Tourism
 (15) Economy, Industry and Competitiveness
 (16) Industry, Trade and Tourism

See also
 Comisión Nacional de Energía (Spain)
 IDAE

Notes and references

External links
 Ministry of Industry, Tourism and Trade of Spain.

 
Government ministries of Spain